The 2017 Nordic Futsal Cup was played in Norway from 28 November to 3 December 2017.

Standings

Matches 

Nordic Futsal Cup
2017–18 in European futsal
2017–18 in Danish football
2017 in Norwegian football
2017 in Swedish football
2017 in Finnish football
2017 in Icelandic football
December 2017 sports events in Europe